Quasipaa fasciculispina is a species of frog in the family Dicroglossidae. It is known under many common names: spiny-breasted giant frog, spiny-breasted frog, spine-glanded mountain frog, and Thai paa frog. It is found in the Cardamom Mountains in southwestern Cambodia and eastern Thailand.
It is found in on near fast-flowing mountain streams in tropical evergreen forests. It is threatened by collecting for human consumption and by habitat loss.

References

fasciculispina
Amphibians of Cambodia
Amphibians of Thailand
Taxonomy articles created by Polbot
Amphibians described in 1970